Evelyn station is a former VTA Light Rail station located in Mountain View, California. The station platform was on the then-single-track section east of the Downtown Mountain View light rail station. It was accessed via a pedestrian tunnel under the Caltrain tracks from Evelyn Avenue at the intersection with Pioneer Way. The station was closed in 2015 to permit double-tracking of the line.

History

The station was built as part of the Tasman West extension project and opened December 17, 1999. The VTA decided in August 2014 to close and remove Evelyn station early in 2015. As part of the Light Rail Efficiency Project, a second track was added between Mountain View Station and Whisman Station for the Mountain View–Winchester, and leaving Evelyn in place would have required narrowing Central Expressway and Evelyn Avenue to accommodate the track. According to VTA, the station was the second least-utilized station in the VTA light rail system.

After the station closed in 2015, the park and ride lot across the street from the station remained available to transit passengers but was lightly used. In May 2019, the lot was leased to the City of Mountain View who plans to use the lot as a safe place for people living in vehicles to park. The long-term plan is to use the two-acre parking lot parcel to build 180 affordable apartments.

References

External links

Park & Ride Lots - Evelyn Light Rail Station at VTA
Map and details of planned closure and removal

Former Santa Clara Valley Transportation Authority light rail stations
Railway stations in Mountain View, California
Demolished buildings and structures in California
Buildings and structures demolished in 2015
Demolished railway stations in the United States
Railway stations in the United States opened in 1999
Railway stations closed in 2015
1999 establishments in California
2015 disestablishments in California